The Eastern Statistical Region is one of eight statistical regions of North Macedonia. Eastern, located in the eastern part of the country, borders Bulgaria. Internally, it borders the Vardar, Skopje, Northeastern, and Southeastern statistical regions.

Municipalities

Eastern statistical region is divided into 11 municipalities:

Demographics

Population
The current population of the Eastern Statistical Region is 181,858 citizens or 9.0% of the total population of the Republic of North Macedonia, according to the last population census in 2002.

Ethnicities
The largest ethnic group in the region are the Macedonians.

References

 
Statistical regions of North Macedonia